Kim Jong-ho is the name of:

 Kim Chong-hoh (1935–2018), South Korean politician
 Kim Jong-ho (politician), North Korean politician
 Kim Jong-ho (baseball) (born 1984), South Korean baseball player
 Kim Jong-ho (archer, born 1994), South Korean compound archer
 Kim Jong-ho (archer, born 1996), South Korean recurve archer